Amblyseius ipomoeae is a species of mite in the family Phytoseiidae.

References

ipomoeae
Articles created by Qbugbot
Animals described in 1967